Tipuloidea is a superfamily of flies containing the living families Cylindrotomidae, Limoniidae, Pediciidae and Tipulidae, and the extinct family Architipulidae. A common name for it is crane flies, which is also applied specifically to family Tipulidae.

At least 15,300 species of crane flies have been described, most of them (75%) by the specialist Charles Paul Alexander.

Description 
Adult crane flies are typically slender-bodied and have long legs. Like other insects, their wings are marked with wing interference patterns which vary among species, thus are useful for species identification. They occur in moist, temperate environments such as vegetation near lakes and streams. They generally do not feed, but some species consume nectar, pollen and/or water.

Larvae occur in various habitats including marshes, springs, decaying wood, moist soil, leaf litter, fungi, vertebrate nests and vegetation. They usually feed on decaying plant matter and microbes associated with this, but some species instead feed on living plants, fungi or other invertebrates.

References 

 
Diptera superfamilies